La Voix lycéenne, previously known as Union Nationale Lycéenne (in English, National Union of Secondary Students) is a French secondary student trade-union. It was founded in 1994. It aims to defend and represent secondary school students, in the development of student democracy and the defense of student rights, as well as running campaigns on matters such as combating discrimination and defending the rights of students who are undocumented migrants. UNL frequently organizes protests and public demonstrations, particularly when the right was in power between 2002 and 2012; the union demonstrated in the streets every year since 2001.

On the European level, UNL is a member of the Organising Bureau of European School Student Unions (OBESSU), in which it represents French students.

Presidencies

 1994 : Samuel Gion, founding president
 1995 : Michaël Delafosse, first elected president
 December 1997 – December 1998 : Issam Krimi (elected by the 1st congress)
 December 1998 – Mai 1999 : Lô Vitting (elected by the 1st convention)
 May 1999 – January 2000: Benjamin Vételé (elected by the CN of May 1999)
 January 2000 – October 2001 : Perrine Corcuff (elected by the 2nd congress)
 October 2001 – September 2002 : Stéphan Babonneau (elected by the CN of October 2001 then by the 3rd congress)
 September 2002 – January 2004 : Lucas Jourdain (elected by the CN of September 2002)
 January 2004 – September 2005 : Constance Blanchard (elected by the 4th congress)
 September 2005 – September 2006 : Karl Stoeckel (elected by the CN of September 2005 then by the 5th congress)
 September 2006 – March 2008 Floréale Mangin (elected by the CN of September 2006)
 March 2008 – September 2008 : Florian Lecoultre (elected by the 6th congress)
 September 2008 - October 2009 : Lucie Bousser (elected by the CN of September 2008)
 October 2009 - October 2010 : Antoine Evennou (elected by the CN of October 2009, then by the 7th congress).
 October 2010 - October 2012 : Victor Colombani (elected by the CN of October 2010)
 In 2022 Colin Champion

See also
 Students' union
 OBESSU

External links
 Official Website (fr)

Students' unions in France